China Village is an unincorporated village in the town of China, Kennebec County, Maine, United States. China Village has a post office with ZIP code 04926. Most of the village is part of the China Village Historic District, added to the National Register of Historic Places in 1977.

Geography
China Village is located in the northern part of the town of China, at the northern tip of China Lake.  It is roughly T-shaped, with a central junction of Main Street, Neck Road, and Causeway Road, the latter coming in at right angles to the other two.  Canton and Peking Streets form a cluster of residences as side streets to the southeast of this junction.  Public services in the village include a library, post office, and the local Baptist church.  Most of the buildings in the village are residences, with about 75% built before 1850, exhibiting either Federal or Greek Revival styling.

History
The area that is now China was surveyed by 1773-74 by John "Black" Jones, and was first known as Jones Plantation.  A larger was incorporated in 1792 as "Harlem", and China was incorporated out of parts of Harlem and neighboring communities in 1818, eventually annexing the remainder of Harlem.  The village grew at the north end of the lake due to the water power provided by nearby streams, and eventually became a stop on a regional stagecoach line.  An academy was established 1823.

See also
National Register of Historic Places listings in Kennebec County, Maine

References

Villages in Kennebec County, Maine
China, Maine
Historic districts on the National Register of Historic Places in Maine
National Register of Historic Places in Kennebec County, Maine
Federal architecture in Maine
Greek Revival architecture in Maine